Trotsky is a Russian biographical eight-episode television mini-series about Leon Trotsky directed by Alexander Kott and Konstantin Statsky. The series stars Konstantin Khabensky in the title role. It debuted on Channel One in Russia on 6 November 2017 for the centenary of the Russian Revolution. The series is a rare high-budget artistic representation of Trotsky in post-Soviet Russia, as his name was a taboo during most of the Soviet period.

Plot
The series is structured as a series of flashbacks to earlier episodes in Trotsky's life, framed by events during his asylum in Mexico City (1939-1940). The first episode begins in May 1940, on the outskirts of Mexico City, when a group of Mexican Communists dressed as policemen attack Trotsky's house. After shooting into the house for nearly a quarter hour, Trotsky and his wife amazingly survive untouched. Afterwards, he reflects on his situation. Having lost almost all those close to him during his eleven years of exile from the USSR, Trotsky perceives USSR leader Stalin, will relentlessly pursue him until he is dead. Trotsky decides to leave a political testament of how a man from an oppressed minority managed to successfully overthrow the Tsarist regime and establish a new social order. He invites an ideological opponent – a Canadian journalist sympathetic to Stalin – to work with him and write that testament. Each episode of the series then explores a period in his life as an emerging leader of the Communist Revolution who then lost his new power to Stalin.

Cast and characters

Konstantin Khabensky as Leon Trotsky
Olga Sutulova as Natalia Sedova
Aleksandra Mareeva as Aleksandra Sokolovskaya
Maksim Matveyev as Frank Jacson (Ramón Mercader)
Yevgeny Stychkin as Vladimir Lenin
Aleksandra Remizova as Nadezhda Krupskaya
Mikhail Porechenkov as Alexander Parvus
Andreyus Paulavichyus as Herr Kobert
Orkhan Abulov as Joseph Stalin
Igor Chernevich as Sigmund Freud
Oleg Gayanov as Georgiy Khrustalyov-Nosar
Viktoria Poltorak as Frida Kahlo
Sergei Garmash as Nikolai Trotsky
Mikhail Eliseev as Nicholas II
Vitaly Kovalenko as Pyotr Stolypin
Denis Sinyavskiy as Alexander Kerensky
Andrei Zibrov as Wilhelm II
Pyotr Zhuravlyov as Paul von Hindenburg
Artur Kharitonenko as Max Hoffmann
Sergey Bezrukov as Vladimir Skalon
Andrei Smelov as Lavr Kornilov
Sergey Sosnovsky as David Bronstein
Aleksandr Bargman as Diego Rivera
Nikolai Kachura as Maxim Gorky
Dmitri Vorobyov as Georgi Plekhanov
Boris Khasanov as Lev Kamenev
Denis Pyanov as Grigory Zinoviev
Boris Ivushin as Felix Dzerzhinsky
Vadim Skvirskiy as Mikhail Tukhachevsky
Vladimir Chernyshov as Yakov Sverdlov
Anton Momot as Kliment Voroshilov
Sergei Umanov as Leonid Krasin
Maria Skuratova as Nina Sedova
Artyom Bystrov as Nikolai Markin
Ivan Tarabukin as Yakov Agranov
Kirill Zaytsev as Fyodor Raskolnikov
Kirill Pirogov as Ivan Ilyin
Anastasia Meskova as Larissa Reissner
Anton Khabarov as Alexey Schastny

Production
The proposal for the series came from Konstantin Ernst, the chief of Channel 1 (other series produced by the Sreda production company were offered to TV channels during the screenwriting stage).

According to Elena Afanasieva, Director of Creative Channel Planning Directorate of the Channel 1, less than a year passed since the idea of the series was introduced and until the end of the shooting. Subsequently, Konstantin Ernst confirmed this, saying that another TV series about the revolution that the channel planned to implement was shelved, as a result which he had to urgently appeal to Alexander Tsekalo with a proposal to shoot a series about Trotsky.

Konstantin Khabensky previously portrayed Lev Trotsky in the 2005 TV series Yesenin. According to Konstantin Ernst, producer of both TV series, Khabensky played "incorrectly". Khabensky himself claims that 80% of his role was cut out, and in the new television series he plays Trotsky in accordance with his first idea.

Reception

Release
It premiered on 16 October 2017 at the MIPCOM in Cannes, which was the featured highlight of the "Russian Content Revolution" program.

According to Mediascope, the series started on Channel One on 6 November 2017 with a rating of 4.9% and 14.8%, becoming the most popular TV series of Russian television for the period from 6 to 12 November 2017, having overtaken another series about the October Revolution Demon of the Revolution in the same time slot (rating - 3.6%, share - 9.7%) on Russia-1. At the end of 2018, streaming company Netflix bought the distribution right of the series and made it available on its platform.

Criticism
The series has been criticized for numerous historical inaccuracies in its depiction of Trotsky as a megalomaniacal leader who masterminded the October Revolution, invoking many of the antisemitic tropes used by the White Guard during the Russian Civil War. Among the many historical falsehoods are that he knew his assassin to be a Stalinist and invited him to write his biography for him. The important (and final) episode of Trotsky's assassination by Ramon Mercader, the NKVD agent, ordered by Joseph Stalin, and the role of his lover Sylvia, who facilitated his admission to Trotsky's household, are totally misconstrued or downplayed. Facing the criticism, Konstantin Ernst, the general producer of the series, insisted that they were aiming to weave a fictionalized narrative around the basic facts of Trotsky's biography rather than making a documentary.

The series has also been criticized by RFE/RL journalist Luke Johnson for "taking contemporary Russia’s anti-revolutionary ideology global" and for being a vehicle for Russian state propaganda, "unmistakably align[ed] with the Kremlin worldview", critical of "Western decadence" and foreign "interference" in Russian domestic affairs.

Awards
The Association of Film and Television Producers in Russia awarded the series in the categories Best Sound, Best Editing, Best Makeup, Best Art Direction, Best Cinematography, Best Special Effects, Best Actress (Olga Sutulova), Best Actor (Konstantin Khabensky), Best TV series.

References

External links
Official website
Trotsky at Konstantin Khabensky's International Site
Trotsky on Eccho Rights
Trotsky on IMDb

Films directed by Alexander Kott
Channel One Russia original programming
2017 Russian television series debuts
2017 Russian television series endings
2010s Russian television series
Russian biographical films
Russian-language television shows
Russian drama television series
Russian television miniseries
Television series by Sreda
Russian political television series
Biographical films about revolutionaries
Biographical films about politicians
Russian biographical television series
Cultural depictions of Leon Trotsky
Cultural depictions of Vladimir Lenin
Cultural depictions of Joseph Stalin
Cultural depictions of Nicholas II of Russia
Cultural depictions of Frida Kahlo
Cultural depictions of Sigmund Freud
Cultural depictions of Paul von Hindenburg
Television series set in the 1890s
Television series set in the 1900s
Television series set in the 1910s
Works about the Russian Revolution